Eddie Gray (8 January 1915 – 18 March 2009) was a former Australian rules footballer who played with Collingwood in the Victorian Football League (VFL).

Notes

External links 
		
Eddie Gray's profile at Collingwood Forever

1915 births
2009 deaths
Australian rules footballers from Victoria (Australia)
Collingwood Football Club players
Eaglehawk Football Club players